Tamim Al-Dawsari (born 4 June 1989) is a Saudi Arabian professional footballer who plays as a winger for Al-Sharq.

Career
Al-Dawsari began his career at the youth team of Al-Nassr. Al-Dawsari joined with Al-Qala in 2008 To participate in the playoffs Saudi Third Division . and joined with Al-Shabab in 2010  On 14 January 2014, Al-Dawsari joined side Al-Shoulla on loan for the 2013–14 season . On 25 August 2014, Al-Dawsari left Al-Shabab and signed a one-year contract with Al-Shoulla . On 16 January 2015, Al-Dawsari left Al-Shoulla and signed a two-year contract with Al-Raed. On 16 October 2016, Al-Dawsari signed contract with Al-Kawkab. On 9 August 2022, Al-Dawsari joined Al-Sharq.

References

External links 
 

1989 births
Living people
Saudi Arabian footballers
Saudi Arabia youth international footballers
Al Nassr FC players
Al-Qala Club players
Al-Shabab FC (Riyadh) players
Al-Shoulla FC players
Al-Raed FC players
Al-Kawkab FC players
Al-Nahda Club (Saudi Arabia) players
Al-Diriyah Club players
Al-Sharq Club players
Saudi Professional League players
Saudi First Division League players
Saudi Second Division players
Saudi Fourth Division players
Association football wingers